Karl Valdemar Westerlund (24 February 1907 – 23 November 1997) was a Norwegian politician for the Labour Party.

He served as a deputy representative to the Norwegian Parliament from Hedmark during the term 1965–1969.

References

1907 births
1997 deaths
Deputy members of the Storting
Hedmark politicians
Labour Party (Norway) politicians